Dinko Petrov (born 10 March 1935) is a Bulgarian former wrestler who competed in the 1956 Summer Olympics, in the 1960 Summer Olympics, and in the 1964 Summer Olympics.

References

External links
 

1935 births
Living people
Olympic wrestlers of Bulgaria
Wrestlers at the 1956 Summer Olympics
Wrestlers at the 1960 Summer Olympics
Wrestlers at the 1964 Summer Olympics
Bulgarian male sport wrestlers
Olympic bronze medalists for Bulgaria
Olympic medalists in wrestling
Medalists at the 1960 Summer Olympics
20th-century Bulgarian people
21st-century Bulgarian people